This is a list of open-wheel single seater formula racing motorsport champions in the Formula 4 class. This list contains only those championships that operate using the vehicle regulations launched by the FIA Single Seater Commission in March 2013.

Series

Argentina

Australia

Brazil

Britain

China

Denmark

France

Germany

Italy

Japan

North and Central America

Northern European Zone

Russia

South-East Asia

Spain

United Arab Emirates

United States

References

champions
Formula 4